Wings Hockey Club Arlanda (or simply "Wings HC", formerly "RA 73" and "Arlanda Wings") is a Swedish hockey club based in the northern exurb of Märsta in Stockholm County.  The club currently plays in group 1D of Division 1, the third tier of the Swedish hockey system.

External links
Official site
Profile on Eliteprospects.com

Ice hockey teams in Sweden
Ice hockey teams in Stockholm County